The 1968–69 ABA season was the second season for the American Basketball Association. Two teams relocated: Minnesota Muskies became the Miami Floridians. The Pittsburgh Pipers moved to Minnesota and became the Minnesota Pipers. Two others relocated within their territory. The Anaheim Amigos became the Los Angeles Stars. The New Jersey Americans became the New York Nets. The season ended with the Oakland Oaks capturing their first ABA championship.

Final standings

Eastern Division

Western Division

Asterisk (*) denotes playoff team

Bold – ABA Champions

Awards and honors

 ABA Most Valuable Player Award: Mel Daniels, Indiana Pacers
 Rookie of the Year: Warren Jabali, Oakland Oaks
 Coach of the Year: Alex Hannum, Oakland Oaks
 Playoffs MVP: Warren Jabali, Oakland Oaks
 All-Star Game MVP: John Beasley, Dallas Chaparrals
All-ABA First Team 
 Connie Hawkins, Minnesota Pipers (2nd selection)
 Rick Barry, Oakland Oaks
 Mel Daniels, Indiana Pacers (2nd selection)
 Jimmy Jones, New Orleans Buccaneers 
 Larry Jones, Denver Rockets (2nd selection)
All-ABA Second Team 
 John Beasley, Dallas Chaparrals (2nd selection) 
 Doug Moe, Oakland Oaks (1st Second Team selection, 2nd overall selection) 
 Red Robbins, New Orleans Buccaneers
 Donnie Freeman, Miami Floridians 
 Louie Dampier, Kentucky Colonels
All-Rookie Team
 Ron Boone, Dallas Chaparrals
 Warren Jabali, Oakland Oaks
 Larry Miller, Los Angeles Stars
 Gene Moore, Kentucky Colonels
 Walter Piatkowski, Denver Rockets

See also

1969 ABA Playoffs

References

 
ABA